David Jaime Kavlin (born December 26, 1971, in Salta, Argentina) is an Argentine radio personality, actor, singer and television host.

Life and career

1971 – 2000: Early life
David Kavlin was born on December 26, 1971, in the province of Salta, Argentina. His father is Bolivian and his grandparents were Jews from Germany, Ukraine and from Belgium.

He got his bachelor's degree in social communication at the National University of Córdoba. In 1985 he got his first job in a pirate radio. Thanks to that he managed to be the radio and television host of Maratón. At this stage of his career he became a local celebrity in his native province, Salta.

Years later he moved to Cordoba, where he worked for the two most important TV channels of the city. There he met his TV partner "El Mono" Amuchastegui. His TV Programme 12 mil, received a nominations for the Martín Fierro Awards in 1993.

In 1996 he travelled to Paraguay, where he co-hosted Canal 13's Verano Heat with "El Mono" and the radio show Radio SO'O in Asunción. In 1997 he hosted Verano Heat and El gusto es nuestro on Canal 13. From 97–99 he was the radio host of Gracias por molestar.

In 1999 he started working for Telefuturo channel. He hosted a TV show titled Anochecer de un día agitado. In 2000 he was the host of Verano agitado-Puerto verano. That same year he hosted the radio show Molestia aparte.

2001–2010: Mainstream success
In 2001, he started hosting the successful TV show Vale la pena. In 2003 he hosted the Argentine version of Fear Factor titled Factor Miedo.

In 2005 he hosted the new version of the classic Game Show Feliz Domingo. The show was canceled in 2006.

In early 2007 co-hosted the TV show Fox Sports Playa with Alejandra Martínez, which was broadcast by Fox Sports (Latinoamérica). That same year he also co-hosted Canal 13's Aunque ud. no lo viera with TV partner "El Mono" Amuchastegui. In June he co-hosted the morning TV show D9A12 with Susana Roccasalvo. The show was suddenly canceled in 2007.

In 2008 he came back as the TV host of Improvisados ¿Dónde está el guion?, which he co-hosted with his friend "El Mono" Amuchastegui on Magazine. Thanks to this the TV Show received a nomination for Martín Fierro de Cable 2009.

In 2010 he guest starred on the TV soap opera Alguien que me quiera, broadcast by Canal 13. On the same year he was chosen to act in a Mexican TV Series titled El talismán, which was produced by Pol-Ka.

2011–present: Recent years
In 2011 Vale 97.5 played Desperté, his debut single. Also another of his songs was the theme song of the Chilean soap opera Peleles. The song is called Dos amantes and was written by Kavlin himself. He also hosted Canal 26's Lo que pasa en el Día.

In 2012 he hosted Kavlin de Último Momento a late night show, which broadcast by Canal 26.

On December 2, 2013, he started hosting the radio show Informant3s

On June 3, 2014, he started hosting the Late Night show Día 24, on A24 channel. At the moment he is the host of A24's Mediodías, más que noticias.

Credits

Television

Radio

Discography 
Studio Albums
 2012: Belleza reversible

See also
Fear Factor
List of Argentines

References

External links
 Official Site
 
 Official Youtube Channel
 Official Facebook
 Official Twitter
 Official My Space
 Official SoundCloud
 Official Google Plus

1971 births
Living people
21st-century Argentine male singers
Argentine television personalities
Argentine people of Bolivian descent
Argentine people of Belgian descent
Argentine people of German-Jewish descent
Argentine people of Ukrainian-Jewish descent
Jewish Argentine musicians
Jewish Argentine male actors
People from Salta Province